Pasakuh Rural District is a rural district (dehestan) in Zavin District, Kalat County, Razavi Khorasan Province, Iran. At the 2006 census, its population was 3,647, in 855 families.  The rural district has 23 villages.

References 

Rural Districts of Razavi Khorasan Province
Kalat County